Urretxu (Spanish, Villareal de Urrechu) is a town located in the province of Gipuzkoa, in the Autonomous Community of the Basque Country, northern Spain.

Situated on the Urola river, it is contiguous with the larger town of Zumarraga immediately to the south, with the river making the boundary between them.

References

External links
 Official Website Information available in Spanish and Basque.
 URRETXU in the Bernardo Estornés Lasa - Auñamendi Encyclopedia (Euskomedia Fundazioa) Information available in Spanish

Municipalities in Gipuzkoa